Paul McGill may refer to:
 Paul McGill (luthier), American luthier
 Paul McGill (actor), American actor, choreographer and director